Grand Hotel Excelsior is a 1982 Italian comedy film directed by Castellano & Pipolo.  The film was a commercial success, being the best grossing film in the season 1982/83 at the Italian box office.

Plot 
Four funny characters are working in a luxurious Grand Hotel. Mr. Thaddeus is the hotel manager, lover of beautiful music and womanizer; Egisto Costanzi is a waiter who has lost his wife and who is in search of the ideal woman; Segrate is the magician illusionist entertainer evenings at Hotel. He is a vainglorious and bungler man, who never has managed to levitate. Finally in the hotel there is a bungler boxer: Pericles, who organizes the end of the story a great evening concert, where they play all four star protagonists of the film.

Cast 
 Adriano Celentano: Taddeus
 Enrico Montesano: Egisto Costanzi
 Carlo Verdone: Pericle Coccia
 Diego Abatantuono: Nicolino, Il mago di Segrate
 Eleonora Giorgi: Ilde Vivaldi
 Aldina Martano: Ginevra
 Tiberio Murgia: imbianchino
 Franco Diogene: ingegner Binotti
 Armando Brancia: Bertolazzi
 Enzo Andronico: Manager of Bulldozer

See also       
 List of Italian films of 1982

References

External links

1982 films
Italian comedy films
1982 comedy films
Films directed by Castellano & Pipolo
Films scored by Armando Trovajoli
Films set in hotels
1980s Italian-language films
1980s Italian films